Strangers: The Story of a Mother and Daughter is a 1979 American made-for-television drama film directed by Milton Katselas and starring Bette Davis and Gena Rowlands. It was broadcast May 13, 1979 on CBS.

Davis won an Emmy Award for Outstanding Lead Actress in a Miniseries or Movie for her performance.

Plot
Bette Davis stars as Lucy Mason, an embittered New England widow who, after an estrangement of 20 years, is reunited with her daughter Abigail (Gena Rowlands). The two women attempt to repair their relationship when the daughter is diagnosed with cancer.

Ford Rainey, Donald Moffat, Whit Bissell and Royal Dano also appear.

Cast
Bette Davis as Lucy Mason
Gena Rowlands as Abigail Mason
Ford Rainey as Mr. Meecham
Donald Moffat as Wally Ball
Whit Bissell as Dr. Henry Blodgett
Royal Dano as Mr. Willis
Kate Riehl as Mrs. Brighton

External links
 

1979 television films
1979 films
1979 drama films
American drama television films
CBS network films
Films scored by Fred Karlin
Films about mother–daughter relationships
1970s English-language films
Films directed by Milton Katselas
1970s American films